Vir gloriosus (Latin for "glorious man", endoxos) or gloriosissimus ("most glorious", endoxotatos) was the highest rank available to the senatorial aristocracy of the East Roman or Byzantine Empire in the 6th century. The title was introduced following the increasing proliferation, and hence debasement, of the earlier senatorial titles, such as vir illustris.

The title was restricted to the highest functionaries of the state, namely the magistri militum, the praetorian prefects, the quaestor sacri palatii and the magister officiorum, as well as an honorific to some important barbarian rulers, like Theodoric the Great, who were nominally Imperial subjects.

Notes

Sources 
 

Byzantine titles and offices
Ancient Roman titles
6th century in the Byzantine Empire